The 1984 Alabama Crimson Tide football team (variously "Alabama", "UA", "Bama" or "The Tide") represented the University of Alabama in the 1984 NCAA Division I-A football season. It was the Crimson Tide's 92nd overall and 51st season as a member of the Southeastern Conference (SEC). The team was led by head coach Ray Perkins, in his second year, and played its home games at Bryant–Denny Stadium in Tuscaloosa and Legion Field in Birmingham, Alabama. Alabama finished the season with a record of five wins and six losses (5–2 overall, 2–1 in the SEC). This marked Alabama's first losing season since the Tide went 2–3–1 in 1957 under Jennings B. Whitworth, and ended its streak of 26 straight bowl appearances.

Some of the more notable contests of the season included a season-opening loss to Boston College (and their quarterback, Doug Flutie, who went on to win the 1984 Heisman Trophy), a third consecutive loss to Tennessee in which the Tide gave up a 14-point fourth quarter lead, and Alabama's first loss to Vanderbilt since 1969. However, Alabama did upset Auburn 17–15 in the 1984 edition of the Iron Bowl, denying the Tigers a berth in the Sugar Bowl.

Schedule

References
General

 

Specific

Alabama
Alabama Crimson Tide football seasons
Alabama Crimson Tide football